Ella Amitay Sadovsky (born 1964) is an Israeli artist, born in Kibbutz Gesher, Israel.

Biography
Amitay Sadovsky studied in Technion, where she received her BSc in 1991 and MSc in 1994. She received her PhD from the Weizmann Institute of Science in 1999. Amitay Sadovsky is a lecturer at the Department of Textile Design, at Shenkar College of Engineering and Design in Tel Aviv. Her works are included in public and private, national and international collections, including those of The Open Museum’s, Janco Dada Museum’s collection, the Shiff Collection of art and Luciano Benetton's Imago Mundi collection.

Exhibitions

Solo
 2004 Women of the Village, University of California, Berkeley, USA
 2009 Band Aids, The Art Gallery, Tivon, Israel
 2010 Dreams Decipherer, Gordon Gallery, Tel Aviv, Israel
 2012 Quite Island, Upcoming Video Projection at Musrara, Jerusalem, Israel
 2012 Short Escape, Gordon Gallery 2 for Contemporary Art, Tel Aviv, Israel
 2014 Spare Parts, The Open museum, Tefen, Israel
 2015 Principle of Uncertainty, Gordon Gallery, Tel Aviv, Israel
 2015 Shelf Life, The Weizmann Institute of Science, Israel
 2016 SEVEN, The Ann and Ari Rosenblatt Prize for Visual Art, The Artist house, Tel Aviv, Israel

Group
Amitay Sadovsky participated in several group exhibitions in Israel and around the world, including at the Haifa Museum of Art, Janco Dada Museum in Ein Hod, The Artist House in Tel Aviv, Eretz Israel Museum, Ashdod Museum of Art, Bait Mani Bank Leumi Museum Space in Tel Aviv, Glasgow School of Art, California College of the Arts.

Honors and awards
 2016 Ann And Ari Rosenblatt prize for visual art
 2015 The MacDowell Colony Fellowship, USA
 2012 Ministry of Israeli Culture and Sports prize
 2005 The Minister of Science scholarship for Returning Scientists.
 2004 Robert Ralls Memorial Scholarship, California College of the Arts.
 2004 Best of Junior Review, California College of the Arts.

Selected publications
Directed Self-Assembly of Gold-Tipped CdSe Nanorods
Evaluation of Young's modulus of polymers from Knoop microindentation tests
Characterization of polymer surface structure and surface mechanical behaviourby sum frequency generation surface vibrational spectroscopy and atomic forcemicroscopy
Hardness and Young’s Modulus of Transcrystalline Polypropylene by Vickers and Knoop Microindentation

References

External links
Ella Amitay Sadovsky profile in Israel Museum catalog of Israeli Artists
Ella Amitay Sadovsky Official Website
America-Israel Cultural Foundation
Faculty of Architecture and Town Planning

1964 births
Living people
20th-century Israeli women artists
21st-century Israeli women artists
Bezalel Academy of Arts and Design alumni
Israeli painters
Israeli women painters
Weizmann Institute of Science alumni